The Autism Directory is a charitable organisation based in the United Kingdom. It aims to pull together useful resources and information concerning autism in the UK, and signpost it from the directory in order to help those living with autism get the help they need.

History
The Autism Directory was launched in November 2010 at Ashrove, a specialist school for autism in Penarth South Wales by Assembly Member Janet Ryder. In September 2011 The Autism Directory achieved its Charity Status and is registered with the Charities Commission.

The Directory
The main activity is the directory which categorises the resources and information about autism into a number of categories (examples below). The directory is UK wide and is user generated so it relies on the community and businesses in local areas to help build the directory.
Health
Treatments & Therapies
Education
Personal Support
Living Support
Money Matters
Recreation & Leisure
Autism Friendly places to go
Other Resources e.g. Events, Conferences, Training, Books Magazines etc.

Autism Friendly Mark
The "Autism friendly" mark is awarded to those companies that have received Autism Awareness training from various approved organisations including The Autism Directory itself. It shows that this particular company has a basic awareness of autism and acts as a good indicator to any potential customers.

Trustees and Management
Steve White - Chairman
Rob Warlow - Treasurer
Carmen Gray - Secretary
Russell Davies - Trustee
Paul Guns - Trustee
Chris Barber - Trustee
Wayne Lewis - Trustee
Chris Price - Trustee
Nadine Honeybone - Founder & CEO
Gareth Tarrant - Charity Operations Officer 
Suzanne McCabe - Head of Support
Joanne Howe - Head of Services
Steven Crichton - Directory Manager

References

External links
The Autism Directory

Autism-related organisations in the United Kingdom
2010 establishments in the United Kingdom
Organizations established in 2010
Charities based in Wales